USS LST-563 was an  built for the United States Navy during World War II. She was in commission during 1944.

Construction and commissioning
LST-563 was laid down on 4 March 1944 at Evansville, Indiana, by the Missouri Valley Bridge and Iron Company. She was launched on 1 May 1944, sponsored by Mrs. N. E. Senescall, and commissioned on 20 May 1944.

Service history
During World War II, LST-563 was grounded on Clipperton Island in the eastern Pacific Ocean, 670 nautical miles (1,241 kilometers) southwest of Mexico, on 21 December 1944 and suffered extensive damage. After numerous unsuccessful attempts to free her, LST-563 was stripped and abandoned on 9 February 1945. She was struck from the Naval Vessel Register on 23 February 1945.

See also
 List of United States Navy LSTs
 List of United States Navy losses in World War II

References

 
 

LST-542-class tank landing ships
World War II shipwrecks in the Pacific Ocean
World War II amphibious warfare vessels of the United States
Ships built in Evansville, Indiana
1944 ships
Maritime incidents in December 1944